Jessika Ponchet (born 26 September 1996) is a French professional tennis player. She has career-high WTA rankings of No. 138 in singles, achieved on 27 February 2023, and No. 101 in doubles, achieved on 28 November 2022.

Career
Ponchet did not play any ITF Junior Circuit tournaments, plunging straight into the ITF Women's Circuit at the age of 14.

2011–2013
Ponchet played the singles events of four tournaments and the doubles event of one tournament on the 2011 ITF Circuit, starting with a $100k tournament held in early July in the French city of Biarritz. She played a total of 11 and 18 ITF tournaments in 2012 and 2013, respectively.

2014–2015
Ponchet played a total of 17 ITF tournaments in 2014. She suffered a major setback when torn knee ligaments forced her to miss tournaments in the first eight months of 2015. She played the singles events of seven tournaments and the doubles event of one tournament on the 2015 ITF Circuit.

2016
Ponchet played a total of 22 tournaments on the ITF Circuit in the 2016 season.

2017
She made her Grand Slam singles' debut at the French Open, after receiving a qualifying wildcard; however, after defeating Dalma Gálfi (the 2015 ITF World Champion in the girls' combined category), she lost to the No. 4 seed Richèl Hogenkamp in the second round.

Ponchet made her WTA 125 tournaments debut at the Open de Limoges, entering only its singles event. She received a wildcard for the main draw, where she defeated her compatriot Chloé Paquet in the first round and lost to the No. 7 seed Kaia Kanepi in the second.

Ponchet finished 2017 with a final win–loss record of 42–24 for singles matches.

2018
She made her Grand Slam and WTA Tour singles' main-draw debut at the Australian Open after receiving a wildcard for the main draw, where she lost in the first round to the No. 3 seed Garbiñe Muguruza. Prior to the Australian Open, Ponchet had in her entire career played in the singles main-draw event of just one tournament that was at a higher level than the ITF Women's Circuit (the 2017 Open de Limoges) and had never even faced a player ranked in the top 100 of WTA singles rankings.

Ponchet made French Open debut after receiving a wildcard for the singles main draw, where she lost in the first round to the unseeded Lucie Šafářová, in straight sets.

2019
At the Australian Open, Ponchet reached the singles main draw where she lost in the first round to 19th-seeded Caroline Garcia, after winning all her three qualifying matches without dropping a set.

On 9 April, in her first-round match of the $25k tournament in Sunderland, Ponchet was leading Tara Moore 6–0, 5–0 and had a match point to achieve a double bagel, but Moore staged a comeback to win 0–6, 7–6, 6–3.

Performance timelines

Singles
Current through the 2023 Australian Open.

Doubles

WTA 125 tournament finals

Doubles: 3 (3 runner-ups)

ITF Circuit finals

Singles: 15 (9 titles, 6 runner–ups)

Doubles: 20 (12 titles, 8 runner–ups)

References

External links
 
 

1996 births
Living people
French female tennis players
21st-century French women